is a Prefectural Natural Park in central Nagano Prefecture, Japan.  Established in 1964, the park spans the borders of the municipalities of Okaya, Shiojiri, and Tatsuno.

See also
 National Parks of Japan

References

External links
  Map of the parks of Nagano Prefecture

Parks and gardens in Nagano Prefecture
Protected areas established in 1964
1964 establishments in Japan
Okaya, Nagano
Shiojiri, Nagano
Tatsuno, Nagano